Khalid Skah (born 29 January 1967) is a Moroccan track and field athlete, winner of the 10,000 metres at the 1992 Summer Olympics.

Born in Midelt, Morocco, Skah established himself first as a good cross country runner by winning the IAAF World Cross Country Championships in 1990 and 1991.

Racing career

1991 World Championships
His first major tournament on track was 1991 World Championships where he at first won a bronze in 10,000 m and then finished sixth at the 5000 m run. This was a disappointing outcome for Skah as, earlier in the season, he had won the 10000 m race in Oslo against a very strong field and had emerged as one of the favourites for the finals in Tokyo. However, for the 10 000 m final Richard Chelimo and the eventual world champion, Moses Tanui (both of Kenya), employed some very elaborate tactics and worked as a team. By the time of the 5000 m final Skah was probably tired. Yobes Ondieki of Kenya, who won the gold medal in the 5000 m, had expected Skah to be his major rival.

1992 Olympics
The following year, at the Barcelona Olympics, Skah met Chelimo again.  With three laps remaining in the 10,000 m final, the two athletes were clear and battling for the gold medal.  At this point the pair came to lap another Moroccan athlete, Hammou Boutayeb, who stayed with the leaders even after being lapped. The rules state that a lapped runner cannot "assist" another runner but, although Boutayeb's actions were interpreted as unsportsmanlike by the crowd, it was certain that there was  collusion, Skah gained advantage, Chelimo was disadvantaged.  These events incensed the Spanish crowd, and the Swedish track judge Carl-Gustav Tollemar attempted to stop Boutayeb.

During the final 150 m Skah sprinted away from Chelimo to win the race and was disqualified, making Chelimo the Olympic champion.  However, the Moroccans appealed the disqualification and Skah was reinstated as Olympic champion the next morning, because the rule under which he was disqualified did not define a penalty.

Other races
In 1993 Skah won the 5000 m race at Weltklasse Zürich. However, he finished fifth in 5000 m at the 1993 World Championships. He ran his only world record in 2 miles (8:12.17) in the same season. He won the 1994 World Semi-Marathon Championships and finished second in 10,000 m at the 1995 World Championships.

Skah's last major international meet was the 1996 Summer Olympics, where he finished seventh in the 10 000 m. In 1995, Skah was given Norwegian citizenship, where he lived and trained with athletes club B.U.L. After that, the Moroccan Athletics Association banned him from international competitions. Skah was reinstated in 2001, after which he tried a comeback to re-establish himself as one of the world's best long distance runners, finishing tenth in the World Half Marathon Championships that year.

References

External links

1967 births
People from Midelt
Living people
Moroccan male long-distance runners
Moroccan male marathon runners
Olympic athletes of Morocco
Olympic gold medalists for Morocco
Athletes (track and field) at the 1992 Summer Olympics
Athletes (track and field) at the 1996 Summer Olympics
World Athletics Championships athletes for Morocco
World Athletics Championships medalists
Fugitives wanted on kidnapping charges
Fugitives wanted by Norway
Prisoners and detainees of France
Moroccan people imprisoned abroad
World Athletics Cross Country Championships winners
World Athletics Half Marathon Championships winners
Medalists at the 1992 Summer Olympics
Olympic gold medalists in athletics (track and field)
Mediterranean Games gold medalists for Morocco
Athletes (track and field) at the 1993 Mediterranean Games
Mediterranean Games medalists in athletics
20th-century Moroccan people
21st-century Moroccan people